During this season FK Čukarički will have participated in the following competitions: Serbian SuperLiga, Serbian Cup, UEFA Europa Conference League.

Current squad

First team

Players with multiple nationalities 
   Stefan Kovač

Out on loan

Competitions

Club Friendlies

Serbian SuperLiga

Results summary

Results by round

Matches

Championship Round

Results by round

Matches

Serbian Cup

UEFA Europa Conference League

Second Qualifying Round

Third Qualifying Round

References

External links
  

FK Čukarički
Cukaricki